Raymond Edward James "Rusty" Whelan (4 November 1921 – 24 December 2002) was an Australian rules footballer who played 100 games for the Sturt Football Club in the South Australian National Football League (SANFL).

Prior to playing with Sturt, Whelan served in the Australian Army during World War II.

Notes

External links 

1921 births
2002 deaths
Australian rules footballers from South Australia
Sturt Football Club players